Wath railway station may refer to a number of railway stations in Yorkshire, England:

serving Wath-upon-Dearne, now in South Yorkshire
 Wath (Hull and Barnsley) railway station, open from 1902 to 1929
 Wath Central railway station, closed in 1959
 Wath North railway station, opened as Wath railway station in 1841, closed in 1968
serving Wath-in-Nidderdale, now in North Yorkshire
 Wath-in-Nidderdale railway station on the Nidd Valley Light Railway, open from 1907 to 1929